John Cunningham Martin (April 29, 1880 in Salem, Illinois – January 27, 1952 in Long Beach, California) was an American politician who served as a member of the US House of Representatives from Illinois and as Illinois treasurer.

Martin attended the public schools and Illinois College in Jacksonville, Illinois. He started his career in banking in 1907 and went on to serve as a director of the Federal Reserve Bank of St Louis from 1922 to 1932. Martin also served as president of the Salem National Bank from 1933 to 1952 and then served as State Treasurer of Illinois from 1933 to 1935 and later from 1937 to 1939. He was also a member of the Illinois Tax Commission and served as the Commission's chairman from 1935 to 1936.

He also served as chairman of the Illinois Emergency Relief Commission 1935 to 1938. He won election as a Democrat to the 76th United States Congress (January 3, 1939 – January 3, 1941), but was not a candidate for renomination in 1940, choosing instead to resume his banking interests.

Martin was buried at East Lawn Cemetery, Salem, Illinois. He was the maternal grandfather of the 25th Governor of Oklahoma Frank Keating.

References

External links
 

1880 births
1952 deaths
People from Salem, Illinois
State treasurers of Illinois
American bankers
Federal Reserve System
Illinois College alumni
Democratic Party members of the United States House of Representatives from Illinois
20th-century American politicians